Longnose skate can refer to several species of rays (fish):

 Beringraja rhina, from the northeast Pacific
 Dentiraja confusa, found off southeastern Australia
 Dipturus oxyrinchus, from the northeast Atlantic and Mediterranean